a.k.a Cassandra is the debut studio album of KC Concepcion, released in 2008. It contains eight cover versions. The album was certified Platinum in Philippines with 25,000 copies sold in 2008.

Singles
"Imposible" was the first single off the album. "Doo Be Doo" was the second single off of the album. The song is a mix of English and Tagalog.

Track listing

Certifications

References

2008 debut albums
KC Concepcion albums